Major General Hugh T. Broomall (born August 18, 1948) is a retired senior officer of the United States Air Force and Delaware Air National Guard who served as the Special Assistant to the Director, Air National Guard. He was responsible for strategy development, state and federal liaison, inter-agency coordination and special studies supporting the one hundred and six thousand Air National Guard members nationwide.

Early life and education
Broomall was born in Wilmington, Delaware, on 18 August 1948. He graduated from Salesianum School in 1966. He attended Delaware Technical and Community College and received a Bachelor of Science degree in business management from Wilmington University in 1985. He went on to earn a master's degree in both human resources and public administration from Wilmington University in 1996. Broomall attended the United States Army War College in 1999. He then went on to earn his doctorate in 2015 from Wilmington University.

Military career
In March 1967, Broomall completed basic training at Lackland Air Force Base, Texas. Broomall received Air Force Administrative Specialist training in Amarillo Air Force Base, Texas, and then returned to the Delaware Air National Guard performing administrative duties for the 166th Maintenance Squadron as a technician. In 1971 he attended the Air Force Communications Operations Course, Sheppard Air Force Base, Texas, and accepted the position of Non-Commissioned Officer in Charge of the 166th Communications Flight.
 
In November 1974, Broomall was commissioned as a second lieutenant through the Academy of Military Science at McGhee Tyson Air National Guard Base, Tennessee. In April 1975 he completed the Air Force Basic Survival Course, Fairchild Air Force Base, Washington. In July 1975 he completed the Department of Defense Armed Forces Air Intelligence Officer Course at Lowry AFB, Colorado and returned as the Air Intelligence Officer. During this tour he completed education in Air Force Intelligence Service, Soviet Military Power Training, Washington, D.C.; United States Air Force Tactical Air Warfare Training, Battle Staff Management, United States Air Force Special Operations School and Latin American Orientation at Hurlburt Field, Florida. Broomall completed Squadron Officer School in 1977, Air Command and Staff College in 1982, National Security Management Course, National Defense University, Washington, D.C. in 1985. From May 1990 to October 1992  he was the Deputy Commander for Support, 166th Tactical Airlift Group. Between assignments he was the Commander 166th Support Group from October 1992 to October 2000. During his tenure he completed courses in administration at the Office of Personnel Management.
 
From January to November 1997, Broomall served in the Congressional Fellowship Program to the U.S. Senator William V. Roth, Jr. As a congressional fellow he served as a primary military staff officer supporting the United States Senate North Atlantic Treaty Organization (NATO) Observer Group. He graduated from the U.S. Army War College, Resident Course, Carlisle Barracks, Pennsylvania in 1999. In October 2000, he was appointed the United States Property and Fiscal Officer for the Delaware National Guard.
 
From May 2004 to August 2010, Broomall served as Assistant Adjutant General-Air, Delaware National Guard. In 2009 he attended the Senior Executive Seminar, George C. Marshall European Center for Security Studies, Garmisch-Partenkirchen, Germany and the Senior Executives in National and International Security program at the Harvard Kennedy School.

Broomall was promoted to Major General on September 18, 2010, and was appointed as Special Assistant to the Director, Air National Guard, Assistant to the Director, Air National Guard, and Assistant to the Secretary of the Air Force. He was the first general officer in the Delaware Air National Guard who had non-prior active duty military service and one of the few to emerge from the enlisted ranks.

Personal

Broomall and his wife Christy are residents of Newark, Delaware.

Honors
In 2011, Broomall was inducted into the Salesianum School Alumni Hall of Fame.

Dates of rank

Awards and decorations

Delaware National Guard

References

1948 births
Living people
Delaware National Guard personnel
Military personnel from Delaware
Wilmington University alumni
National Guard (United States) generals
United States Army War College alumni
Recipients of the Air Force Distinguished Service Medal
Recipients of the Legion of Merit
Salesianum School alumni
United States Air Force generals